Diego Alejandro Torres Ortiz González (born October 27, 1979) is a Mexican association football manager and former player.

Torres was appointed interim manager for Club Tijuana on October 31, 2017, following the departure of Eduardo Coudet.

References

External links
 http://ligamx.net/cancha/cuerpotecnico/16843

1979 births
Living people
Footballers from Aguascalientes
Mexican football managers
Mexican footballers
Association football forwards
Orlando City SC non-playing staff